Norman Cecil Grigg (22 June 1893 – 1 July 1945) was an Australian rules footballer who played with Geelong in the Victorian Football League (VFL).

Notes

External links 

1893 births
1945 deaths
Australian rules footballers from Victoria (Australia)
Geelong Football Club players